This is a complete list of tours by Australian band the Veronicas. As of 2022, they have headlined six national tours in Australia, two international tours and have supported six other tours. They have also done many mini tours.

2006 US Tour

The US tour was their first ever headlining tour. The tour was in support of their first album The Secret Life of.... The tour began on 28 January 2006 and finished 3 March 2006. The supporting acts were October Fall and Jonas Brothers.

Tour dates

Australian Tour 2006

The Australian Tour was their first ever tour in Australia. The nine date tour commenced on 13 April 2006 in Newcastle and concluded on 24 April 2006. The supporting act was Elemeno P. All the shows were sell outs.

Tour dates

The Revolution Tour

The Revolution Tour is the Veronicas second Australian tour and was announced in June, 2006. This tour marked one year since they released their first single, "4ever", in 2005. The tour commenced on 4 August and finished on 27 August 2006. Supporting acts were originally Avalon Drive and Ryan Cabrera but Cabrera dropped out of the tour due to his split from Veronicas twin Lisa.

Tour dates

Exposed... The Secret Life of The Veronicas
On 2 December 2006 the Veronicas released a CD/DVD, entitled Exposed... The Secret Life of The Veronicas in Australia which featured live performances from the Revolution Tour and a DVD featuring parts of the sisters' live performances throughout 2005–2006, including footage that had previously not been seen, and their music videos. The album debuted at #6 on the ARIA DVD Charts accrediting platinum in its first week. The second week it rose to its peak of #3 and was accredited Double Platinum.

Hook Me Up Tour

The Hook Me Up Tour is the Veronicas third national tour of Australia supporting their second album Hook Me Up. The tour went for 10 shows beginning on 30 November 2007 and finishing on 12 December 2007. The supporting acts for the tour were Dean Geyer and Calerway.

Tour dates

Revenge Is Sweeter Tour

The Revenge Is Sweeter Tour is a tour by the Veronicas which was announced in November 2008.

Tour information
The sixteen date tour was their first to extend outside of Australia into New Zealand. The tour will begin on 13 February 2009 in Newcastle and conclude on 7 March 2009 in Dunedin, New Zealand. On 3 April 2009 they announced the show would continue with a US leg starting on 4 June 2009 and ending on 18 July 2009 and then continuing in Japan from 7 to 9 August 2009. On 5 May 2009 it was announced that there would be two shows in Canada one on 27 June and the other on 15 July before they head to Japan. Was announced on 4 August 2009 that while on a promotional visit to the United Kingdom 3 dates of the tour would be played from 23–25 September 2009. A CD/DVD version of the tour was released on 1 September 2009 in Australia. After the tour ended they made their first show in Latin America in the Los Premios MTV Latinoamérica 2009 in Bogota, Colombia.

Supporting acts
Short Stack (Australia)
Metro Station (Australia and New Zealand)
Midnight Youth (New Zealand)
P Money (New Zealand)
Angry Anderson (Guest performer on 19 February in Sydney)
The Pretty Reckless (USA) (select venues)
 Carney (USA/Canada) (select venues)
The Federals (UK) (All Venues)

Tour dates

Critical reception
The tour received mostly positive reviews commenting on the crowd atmosphere and their vocal abilities.

GenQ stated "...the girls were on stage for 1 ½ hours of entertainment in every sense of the word".

The Courier Mail gave a positive review saying "There was plenty of sass, not to mention skin-tight sequined pants, multiple costume changes and lashings of red lipstick, but the girls' big voices were the main attraction" as well as commenting on their performance of 'Heavily Broken' stating "Their emotion-laden ballad Heavily Broken, dedicated to the victims of Victoria's Bushfires, was the only thing that could draw silence from the crowd" and ended it with a comment on the shows family friendly nature saying "If the applause was any indicator, Saturday night's crowd - mums and dads included - were proud of their local girls done good".

Adelaide Now reviewed their performance at the Thebarton Theatre and commented on their stage presence saying "With a string quartet brought in for some songs, back-up dancers for others, the Veronicas delivered a varied and energy filled set"

Set list
"Take Me on the Floor"
"Everything"
"Popular"
"Mouth Shut"
"Revolution"
"Revenge Is Sweeter (Than You Ever Were)"
"Secret"
"Mother Mother"
"Hook Me Up"
"This Love"
"Don't Say Goodbye"
"Heavily Broken"
"4ever"
"Everything I'm Not"
"I Could Get Used to This"
"All I Have"
"When It All Falls Apart"
"Untouched"
"This Is How It Feels"

Source:

Sanctified Tour

Sanctified Tour 

On 19 November 2014, the Veronicas announced via their official Twitter account that they will embark on a month-long Australian tour to promote The Veronicas in 2015. The tour is set to begin on 12 February 2015 in Perth and end on 21 February in Brisbane. An announcement on 19 January revealed that the Sanctified Tour dates will include shows in the UK from 6–11 March with support from Los Angeles-based band Badflower. They announced the American leg in May. The duo cancelled the American leg of the tour due to technical issues in June.

SETLIST:
 "Sanctified" 
 "Did You Miss Me? (I'm A Veronica)" 
 "Take Me on the Floor" 
 "Line of Fire" 
 "Hook Me Up" 
 "Revenge Is Sweeter (Than You Ever Were)" 
 "Teenage Millionaire" 
 "Always" 
 "Let Me Out"
 "Everything I'm Not" 
 "You Ruin Me" 
 "Untouched" 
 "Cruel" 
 "Cold" 
 "This Is How It Feels"
 "4ever"
 "You and Me"
 "If You Love Someone"

Godzilla V Human Tour 
The Godzilla V Human tour is The Veronicas seventh concert tour. The tour was announced on March 26, 2021.

Tour dates

SETLIST:

 "GODZILLA"
 "When It All Falls Apart"
 "Take Me on the Floor"
 "Revenge Is Sweeter (Then You Ever Were)"
 "Stealing Cars" 
 "Silent"
 "Hook Me Up"
 "This Is How It Feels"
 "Human"
 "Heavily Broken" (Sometimes Without You from Human) 
 "Everything I'm Not"
 "In My Blood"
 "Sugar Daddy"
 "Lolita"
  "4ever"
  "You Ruin Me"
  "Untouched"

As supporting acts
In late 2005, the Veronicas supported American musician Ryan Cabrera on a tour through the US along with the Click Five.
In June 2006 the Veronicas were an opening act (along with Ashley Parker Angel) for the Ashlee Simpson US summer tour, but after the first few shows Lisa and Jess had to pull out after Lisa became ill with throat nodules and needed surgery.
 The Veronicas supported Natasha Bedingfield on her 20 date US tour that started on 21 May 2008 in Myrtle Beach and ended on 10 July in San Francisco, Kate Voegele was also a supporting artist on the tour.
 The Veronicas supported American pop-rock band the Jonas Brothers for the last leg of their Burnin' Up Tour. in 2008.
 The Veronicas supported Hanson along with Everybody Else on Hanson's 2008 Walk Around the World Tour.
 IN 2010, the Veronicas were to be supporting acts for Kelly Clarkson's "All I Ever Wanted Fall Tour," but dropped out being replaced by Eric Hutchinson.
 The Veronicas were supporting 5 Seconds of Summer on the USA leg of their Rock Out with Your Socks Out Tour in late 2014.

Non-affiliated tours
 Pre toured their third album in the period 2010-2012
 Did an acoustic tour in America in 2015 with a radio company
 Pride tour 2019 to LA, Chicago and New York 2019

References

The Veronicas
Veronicas